Just like Home can refer to:

 Just like Home (1978 film), a 1978 Hungarian film
 Just like Home (2007 film), a 2007 film